"Deep River" is an anonymous African-American spiritual, popularized by Henry Burleigh in his 1916 collection Jubilee Songs of the USA.

Overview
The song was first mentioned in print in 1867, when it was published in the first edition of The Story of the Jubilee Singers: With Their Songs, by J. B. T. Marsh (page 230). By 1917, when Harry Burleigh completed the last of his several influential arrangements, the song had become very popular in recitals. It has been called "perhaps the best known and best-loved spiritual".

Lyrics
Deep river, my home is over Jordan.
Deep river, Lord, I want to cross over into campground.

Oh, don't you want to go to that Gospel-feast?
That Promised Land, where all is peace?

Adaptations
The melody was adopted in 1921 for the song Dear Old Southland by Henry Creamer and Turner Layton, which enjoyed popular success the next year in versions by Paul Whiteman and by Vernon Dalhart.

"Deep River" has been sung in several films. The 1929 film Show Boat featured it mouthed by Laura La Plante to the singing of Eva Olivetti. Paul Robeson famously sang it accompanied by male chorus in the 1940 movie The Proud Valley. And in the 1983 blockbuster hit National Lampoon's Vacation it was sung by Chevy Chase.

"Deep River" is also one of five spirituals written into the 1941 oratorio A Child of Our Time by Michael Tippett.

Recordings 

Marian Anderson recorded a version in November 1923 for the Victor label (catalog No. 19227).
Paul Robeson recorded the song on May 10, 1927 for the Montgomery Ward label (catalog No. 6054).
Tommy Dorsey recorded a version on February 17, 1941 for the Victor label (catalog No. 36396B).
Adelaide Hall and Kenneth Cantril recorded a version of "Deep River" for their boxed set of Spirituals released in 1949 on London Records. 
Deep River Boys Featuring Harry Douglas with Pete Brown's Orchestra recorded the song in Oslo on August 23, 1956, and released it on the 78 rpm record HMV AL 6039).
Odetta recorded a version for her 1957 album At the Gate of Horn.
Johnny Mathis's third album, Good Night, Dear Lord, released 1958, USA.
The Roger Wagner Chorale recorded Roger Wagner's arrangement, first released on the album The Negro Spiritual for Capitol Records (SP 8600) in 1964.
Mahalia Jackson recorded a version for her 1964 album, Let's Pray Together on the Columbia Records label.
Barbra Streisand 27th studio album, Higher Ground, recorded (USA) November 11, 1997, on the Columbia Records label.
Sacred Music Services recorded a version for their album Get On Board in 2000.
The Tabernacle Choir at Temple Square recorded a version for the album Come, Thou Fount of Every Blessing in 2009.
Bobby Womack recorded a version for his 2012 album The Bravest Man in the Universe.
The Wings Over Jordan Choir recorded the song in June 1946 for Queen Records (catalog No, 4140).
Lorraine Hunt Lieberson's rendition was captured on the album Lorraine Hunt Lieberson at Ravinia. The song was a frequent encore in recital concerts by the operatic mezzo-soprano.
The band of the British South Africa Police recorded a version for the album Kum A Kye, released in Rhodesia.
The Saint Thomas Choir of Men and Boys, Fifth Avenue, New York City recorded a version composed by Gerre Hancock for its album "American Voices."
Sister Thea Bowman, FSPA recorded the song in 1988 for the stereocassette, "Songs of My People." It was re-released in 2020 for the 30th anniversary of Sister Bowman's death as part of the digital album, Songs of My People: The Complete Collection.
The song was performed at the funeral of Ruth Bader Ginsburg by opera singer Denyce Graves.
Beverly Glenn-Copeland included a live recording of the song on his 2020 album Transmissions.
Composer Martin D. Fowler arranged a rendition of the song for the soundtrack of the audio fiction podcast Limetown.

References

External links
 Marian Anderson singing "Deep River", YouTube video.
 The Wings Over Jordan Choir Singing "Deep River" – YouTube Video

African-American spiritual songs
Barbra Streisand songs
Songs about rivers